The 1941 SMU Mustangs football team was an American football team that represented Southern Methodist University (SMU) as a member of the Southwest Conference (SWC) during the 1941 college football season. In their seventh season under head coach Matty Bell, the Mustangs compiled a 5–5 record (2–4 against conference opponents) and outscored opponents by a total of 169 to 106. The team played its home games at Ownby Stadium in the University Park suburb of Dallas.

Fullback Preston Johnson was selected by both the Associated Press and the United Press as a first-team player on the 1941 All-Southwest Conference football team.

Schedule

References

SMU
SMU Mustangs football seasons
SMU Mustangs football